British People's Party may refer to the following parties in the United Kingdom:
 British People's Party (1939)
 British Democratic Party (British People's Party (1979))
 British People's Party (2005)
 British People's Party (2015)